This list of business and industry awards is an index to articles that describe notable awards given to business and industry. The list excludes awards for the adult industry, advertising, aviation and motor vehicles, which are covered by separate lists. It also excludes national quality awards and occupational health and safety awards for the same reason.
The list is organized by region and country of the sponsoring organization, but awards may be open to people or organizations around the world.

International

Africa

Americas

Asia

Europe

Oceania

See also
 Fintech awards
 Lists of awards
 List of adult industry awards
 List of advertising awards
 List of aviation awards
 List of motor vehicle awards
 List of national quality awards
 List of occupational health and safety awards
 :Category:Businesspeople halls of fame

References

 
Business and industry